Hiawatha is a city in Linn County, Iowa, United States. It is a suburb located in the northwestern side of Cedar Rapids and is part of the Cedar Rapids Metropolitan Statistical Area. The population was 7,183 at the time of the 2020 census, an increase from 6,480 in 2000.

History
In 1946, Fay Clark, an entrepreneur of several ventures located in Linn County north of Cedar Rapids, Iowa, had a vision of houses and a highway running through a new city. In 1950 Clark and another 45 residents signed a petition seeking to become the 17th incorporated town in Linn County. The town would be named after Clark's trailer company. That same year he and Henry Katz of Marion established the Linn County Fire Association to help provide fire protection to rural communities. Clark served as mayor of Hiawatha from 1950 to 1958, and again from 1961 to 1963. Clark died in 1991 at the age of 84.

Hiawatha residents celebrated the dedication of their new City Hall on May 17, 2008.

Hiawatha celebrated its 60th anniversary in May 2010.

Geography 
Hiawatha's longitude and latitude coordinates in decimal form are 42.044409, -91.681025.

Hiawatha's population density is estimated at 1884 people per square mile which is considered low for urban areas.

Climate

Demographics

2010 census
As of the census of 2010, there were 7,024 people, 3,071 households, and 1,796 families residing in the city. The racial makeup of the city was 88.9% White, 5.1% African American, 0.2% Native American, 2.2% Asian, 0.2% Pacific Islander, 0.8% from other races, and 2.5% from two or more races. Hispanic or Latino of any race were 2.3% of the population.

There were 3,071 households, of which 29.7% had children under the age of 18 living with them, 42.0% were married couples living together, 11.9% had a female householder with no husband present, 4.5% had a male householder with no wife present, and 41.5% were non-families. 33.3% of all households were made up of individuals, and 8.1% had someone living alone who was 65 years of age or older. The average household size was 2.25 and the average family size was 2.89.

The median age in the city was 37 years. 23.8% of residents were under the age of 18; 9% were between the ages of 18 and 24; 27.7% were from 25 to 44; 26% were from 45 to 64; and 13.5% were 65 years of age or older. The gender makeup of the city was 48.8% male and 51.2% female.

2000 census
As of the census of 2000, there were 6,480 people, 2,859 households, and 1,663 families residing in the city. The racial makeup of the city was 94.24% White, 2.16% African American, 0.31% Native American, 1.53% Asian, 0.37% from other races, and 1.39% from two or more races. Hispanic or Latino of any race were 1.33% of the population.

There were 2,859 households, out of which 29.5% had children under the age of 18 living with them, 44.6% were married couples living together, 10.2% had a female householder with no husband present, and 41.8% were non-families. 33.1% of all households were made up of individuals, and 5.6% had someone living alone who was 65 years of age or older. The average household size was 2.24 and the average family size was 2.89.

Age spread: 23.6% under the age of 18, 12.1% from 18 to 24, 35.4% from 25 to 44, 19.4% from 45 to 64, and 9.6% who were 65 years of age or older. The median age was 32 years. For every 100 females, there were 95.8 males. For every 100 females age 18 and over, there were 95.8 males.

The median income for a household in the city was $40,799, and the median income for a family was $47,135. Males had a median income of $37,277 versus $25,394 for females. The per capita income for the city was $22,664. About 3.4% of families and 4.5% of the population were below the poverty line, including 5.6% of those under age 18 and 1.7% of those age 65 or over.

Parks and recreation
The city of Hiawatha maintains three parks . Each Park has Free Wifi & Little Free Libraries at each of the parks.  
Guthridge Park Located on Emmons Street between 7th and 10th
Tucker Park  Located on B Avenue
Clark Park ParkLocated off N. 18th Avenue

Nature trails
Cedar Valley Nature Trail
Located on Boyson Road in Hiawatha is a trailhead for the Cedar Valley Nature Trail. The trailhead is furnished with picnic tables, restrooms, maps and information about the trail, and parking.

The first  going south from Evansdale are also paved with asphalt, the remaining trail is crushed and packed limestone. The trail has wildflowers and pockets of native remnant prairie grasses that have been enlarged through the process of burning surrounding brush and non-native plants. The trail is also known to have abundant wildlife and birds to observe. Although a fee was charged on the southern part of the trail , the entire trail is now free.
Other trails
A connecting segment of trail continues south from the Cedar Valley Nature Trail head through Hiawatha to connect with the Cedar River trail a  trail in neighboring Cedar Rapids. The city also maintains smaller, unconnected looped walking trails at all three city parks.

Farmers market
The Hiawatha farmers market is located in the 10th Avenue parking lot of Guthridge Park. For the 2011 year, the market will be open beginning April 24 and running through October 30 on Sundays from 11:00am to 2:00pm (local time). Depending on the day, 25 or more entrepreneurs from the area set up their own displays and sell home grown and home made products. These include, but are not limited to: fresh vegetables, fruits, and flowers, an assortment of baked products, preserved food products, arts, and crafts.

Government 

Hiawatha is governed by the Mayor with city council form of government, utilizing several departments, boards, and commissions.The recently built City Hall (dedicated in 2007) is located at 101 Emmons Street Hiawatha, Iowa 52233. The building was designed to include not only the city government and various departments but also includes a Community center and public meeting rooms.

Police department 
The Hiawatha Police Department is located in the lower level of the City Hall building. The department has 14 full-time sworn officers, two reserve police officers and special agent “Reso”, a K-9 unit. Special Agent "Mod" retired from the police department on March 21, 2012. Mod died on August 28, 2013.

Fire department 
The Hiawatha Fire Department is located at 60 10th Avenue; Hiawatha, Iowa 52233. The department's personnel consist of a combination of paid and volunteer firefighters. The Hiawatha Fire Department has the only fire-based ambulance service in Linn County. HFD runs approximately 2,500 fire and EMS calls per year.

Education 
Hiawatha is included in the Cedar Rapids Community School District system.

Public schools

 Hiawatha Elementary School (home of the Cougars) is located at 603 Emmonds street in Hiawatha and opened its doors in 1958. Currently (see reference for date) the school has approximately 310 students in kindergarten through fifth grade and a staff of 64.
 Nixon Elementary School (home of the Bobcats) is located at 200 Nixon Drive in Hiawatha and opened its doors in 1970. The school's philosophy utilizes self-contained classrooms in kindergarten through fifth grade. Currently (see reference for date) Nixon has approximately 330 students and a staff of 58.

 Elementary schools: Most portions are zoned to either Hiawatha or Nixon, though some western parts are zoned to Viola Gibson Elementary School
 Secondary schools: Harding Middle School and Kennedy High School

Private schools

 Essential Montessori School is located at 1350 Blairs Ferry Road Suite A. The school has an enrollment of 46 from prekindergarten to kindergarten.

Notable people 

Salvatore Giunta (born 1985), first living recipient of the Medal of Honor since the Vietnam War.
Kraig Paulsen (born 1964) Iowa State representative, Republican majority leader for the 84th Iowa General Assembly.

References

External links 

Hiawatha Iowa Official Website Home page
HEDCO Website Hiawatha Economic Development Corporation
Business Directory for Hiawatha
City Data Comprehensive statistical data and more about Hiawatha
Hiawatha Advocate Hiawatha's online news source 
American Towns News, organizations, restaurants, and things to do,

Cities in Iowa
Cities in Linn County, Iowa
Cedar Rapids, Iowa metropolitan area
Populated places established in 1950
1950 establishments in Iowa